Dora Nelson may refer to:

 Dora Nelson (play), a play by the French writer Louis Verneuil 
 Dora Nelson (1935 film), a French film directed by René Guissart
 Dora Nelson (1939 film), an Italian film directed by Mario Soldati